VOEA Ngahau Koula may refer to the following ships
 , the first vessel in the Tonga Maritime Force
 , a Guardian-class patrol vessel, given to Tonga by Australia

Ship names